Wu Quanyou (1834–1902), or Wu Ch'uan-yu, was an influential teacher of t'ai chi ch'uan in late Imperial China. His son is credited as the founder of the Wu-style t'ai chi ch'uan. As he was of Manchu descent, and would have been named by his family in Manchu, the name "Wú" (吳) was a sinicisation that approximated the pronunciation of the first syllable of his Manchu clan name, U Hala.

Background
Wu was a military officer in the Yellow Banner camp (see Qing Dynasty Military) in the Forbidden City, Beijing and also an officer of the Imperial Guards Brigade during the Qing Dynasty. At that time, Yang Luchan (1799–1872) was the martial arts instructor in that banner camp, teaching t'ai chi ch'uan. In the camp, there were many officers studying with Yang Luchan, but only three men, Wan Chun (萬春), Ling Shan (凌山) and Ch'uan Yu (全佑) studied diligently and trained hard enough at t'ai chi ch'uan to become disciples. However, they were unable to become Yang Luchan's disciples, because Yang Luchan taught t'ai chi ch'uan to two men of very high status in the military; they were Shi Shaonan and General Yue Guichen.

At that time Wan Chun, Ling Shan and Ch'uan-yu were middle grade officers in the banner camp and because of their rank, they could not be seen as classmates with nobility and high grade officers. As a result, they were asked to become disciples of Yang Pan-hou or Yang Banhou, Yang Luchan's oldest adult son and an instructor as well to the Manchu military.

As a teacher
When Wu retired from the military, he set up a school in Beijing. Wu's Beijing school was successful and there were many who studied with him, he was popularly known as Quan Sanye (全三爺) as a term of respect. His disciples were his son Wu Chien-ch'uan, Guo Songting (郭松亭), Wang Mao Zhai(王茂齋), Xia Gongfu (夏公甫), Chang Yuanting (1860-1918; 常遠亭), Qi Gechen (齊閣臣) (see Wudang t'ai chi ch'uan Lineage) etc. Wu's skills were said to be exceptional in the area of softly "neutralising" (化勁, hua jin) hard energy when attacked, which is a core skill of good t'ai chi ch'uan practice as a martial art.
Chang Yuanting's son, Chang Yunji teaches a style known as quanyou laojia tai chi chuan (全佑老架太极拳) or Chang style tai chi chuan (常氏太極拳).

Formation of the Wu-style
Wu's son, Wu Chien-ch'uan (1870–1942) also became a cavalry officer and t'ai chi ch'uan teacher, working closely with the Yang family and Sun Lu-t'ang, promoting what subsequently came to be known as Wu-style t'ai chi ch'uan in Beijing, Shanghai, and Hong Kong.

T'ai chi ch'uan lineage tree with Wu-style focus

See also
Wu Ying-hua
Ma Yueh-liang
Wu Ta-ch'i
Wu Ta-hsin

References

External links
International Wu Style Tai Chi Chuan Federation at www.wustyle.com Wu family website with a link to a biography of Wu Quanyou (listed as "Wu Chuan Yau")

1834 births
1902 deaths
Chinese tai chi practitioners
Manchu martial artists
Qing dynasty people
Chinese military officers
Bannermen